The 1963 Army Cadets football team represented the United States Military Academy in the 1963 NCAA University Division football season. In their second year under head coach Paul Dietzel, the Cadets compiled a 7–3 record and outscored all opponents by a combined total of 177 to 97.  In the annual Army–Navy Game, the Cadets lost to the Midshipmen by a 21 to 15 score. The Cadets also lost to Minnesota and Pittsburgh. 
 
Army guard Dick Nowak was selected by the UPI and the American Football Coaches Association as a second-team player on the 1963 College Football All-America Team.

Schedule

Roster
 Rollie Stichweh

References

Army
Army Black Knights football seasons
Army Cadets football